The New Fourth Army was a unit of the National Revolutionary Army of the Republic of China established in 1937. In contrast to most of the National Revolutionary Army, it was controlled by the Chinese Communist Party and not by the ruling Kuomintang. The New Fourth Army and the Eighth Route Army were the two main communist forces from 1938. The New Fourth Army was active south of the Yangtze River (Chang Jiang), while the Eighth Route Army was based in Yan'an in the northwest.

Members of the New Fourth Army wore their badges on the left arm, with "N4A" and the soldier's unit and name listed on the badge.

After the Xi'an Incident, the Kuomintang led by Chiang Kai-shek and the Chinese Communist Party led by Mao Zedong formed a United Front against Japan, which was already in control of Manchuria and pushing into North China. The Marco Polo Bridge Incident in July 1937 marked the beginning of the Sino-Japanese War (1937-1945).

In October, 1937, an announcement was made that Red Army soldiers active in the eight provinces in southern China — those who did not embark on the Long March would be part of the New Fourth Army. The New Fourth Army was established on December 25, 1937 in Hankou, moving to Nanchang on January 6, 1938, when the detachments began marching to the battlefront. At the beginning, the New Fourth Army had four detachments and one task force battalion and numbered roughly ten thousand. Later the army moved to Anhui province. Ye Ting was the army commander, Xiang Ying the deputy army commander.

It was in theory a united front against Japan but in practice there was friction between Nationalist and Communist Forces, which intensified in the fall of 1940, culminating in the New Fourth Army Incident with a full-fledged battle between the New Fourth Army and KMT National Revolutionary Army forces. Up until that point, most of the battles had been skirmishes. The army was fully reorganised after the incident and remained in active combat until the end of the war.

History

1937–1938 
In 1938 the 1st, 2nd and 3rd detachments began marching to the battlefront in southern Anhui and southern Jiangsu. The 4th detachment got northern and middle Anhui. Due to being in the back of the Japanese army, the New Fourth Army didn't eliminate very many Japanese troops at first. The majority of the time they were establishing base areas and enlisting new recruits. After the Japanese had occupied Wuhan the New Fourth Army took the opportunity to set up several guerrilla camps in the area.

1939–1940 
In 1939 the Japanese Army stopped attacking the Nationalist forces on a large scale. The New Fourth Army was restricted to the south of the Yangtze River. In order to establish a new base area the New Fourth Army sent an advance team to Northern Jiangsu and clashed with guerrillas of the Nationalist forces there. In the battle of Huangqiao the New Fourth Army destroyed the 89th Army and the 33rd division of the Nationalist forces. The Eighth Route Army also dispatched the 4th detachment's 12,000 men to support the New Fourth Army.

1941–1943 
In January 1941, the Nationalist forces surrounded and destroyed the headquarters of the New Fourth Army in retaliation, losing the New Fourth Army about 8,000 men. The commander of the New Fourth Army was also caught. The Chinese Communist Party (CCP) made a strong protest and announced the rebuilding the New Fourth Army in northern Jiangsu. At this time the New Fourth Army had already had seven divisions and 90,000 soldiers. Between 1941 and 1943, the New Fourth Army fought mainly with the Japanese and lost a portion of the Army's base areas. Because of heavy losses the 6th Division's designation was revoked.

1944–1945 
Due to a lack of troops the Japanese ceased actively attacking the New Fourth Army. Several fierce battles erupted again between the New Fourth Army and the Nationalist forces. The New Fourth Army tried to establish base areas in eastern Zhejiang, Hunan and Hubei Province. When World War Two ended they stopped operations and withdrew from base areas. At that time the New Fourth Army had 268,000 soldiers. In order to quickly occupy northeast China political commissar Huang Kecheng ordered the 3rd Division's 35,000 men to leave his base area.

1946–1947 
In the summer of 1946 the Chinese Civil War broke out. The Nationalist forces attacked the 5th Division first and occupied the division's base area successfully. However, in middle Jiangsu Su Yu's 1st Division miraculously won despite having fewer forces and wiped out 56,000 Nationalist soldiers. Later, because of a lack of troops the 1st, 2nd, 4th, and 7th Divisions had to withdraw to Shandong in the winter of 1946. In January 1947 the New Fourth Army and Shandong Military Region of the People's Liberation Army were merged into the East China Field Army.

Headquarters 

The New Fourth Army Headquarters was located at No. 332-352, Shengli Street, Jiang'an District, Wuhan. The site was renovated by the Wuhan People's Government in 2005. On March 5, 2013, it was named a Major National Historical and Cultural Sites.

Main leadership

Personnel

Guerrillas 
Most of the New Fourth Army's military officers were guerrillas of the Chinese Red Army, others being from the 8th Route Army. Experience from China's Civil War led to them rapidly expanding their forces at the beginning of the Second Sino-Japanese War. During the eight years of the war officers with excellent abilities were usually promoted faster. For example, general Zhang Aiping was only a battalion commander of Chinese Red Army in 1934 but had become a division commander of the New Fourth Army by 1945.

Military Education 
With the rapid expansion of the size of the army a large number of junior officers and newly recruited students needed training. Because of a lack of teachers the Eighth Route Army dispatched hundreds of military instructors to the New Fourth Army in two separate occasions. From 1940 to 1942 the New Fourth Army built and established six military training schools in the battlefield. These military training schools were collectively referred to as branches of the Counter-Japanese Military and Political University.

Organization 
In the first three years of its existence the New Fourth Army operated independently with the regiment as its basic unit. After the New Fourth Army Incident the army was reorganized into seven divisions and nineteen brigades.

1938 
In the spring of 1938 the Chinese Red Army's surviving guerrillas in the South were organized into the New Fourth Army's four detachments.

1941 
After the New Fourth Army Incident the New Fourth Army was rebuilt in January, 1941.

1945 
By the end of World War II the New Fourth Army had grown to 268,000 men.

See also
New Fourth Army Memorial Hall

References 

with Eighth Route Army25 August 1937-1 November 1948

 Smedley, Agnes. Battle Hymn of China. Alfred A. Knopf, 1943.

 
04
Armies led by the Chinese Communist Party in World War II